New Orleans is the major-label debut studio album by American singer-songwriter PJ Morton. The album was released on May 14, 2013, under Young Money, Cash Money and Republic Records. The album is primarily produced by PJ Morton and features guest appearances by Lil Wayne, Tweet, Stevie Wonder, Busta Rhymes and Adam Levine.

Accolades
The album's lead single, "Only One," which features Stevie Wonder, was nominated for the Best R&B Song at the 56th Annual Grammy Awards in 2014.

Track listing

Personnel
 PJ Morton - vocals, bass, keyboards, drum programming
 Warryn Campbell - additional drum programming, additional keyboards
 Mike Moore - drums
 Chris "Daddy" Dave - drums
 Jesse Bond - guitar
 James Valentine - guitar
 Brian Cockerham - bass
 Ed Clark - drums
 Curt Chambers - guitar
 James King, Dontae Winslow - trumpet
 Dwayne Dugger, Kamasi Washington - saxophone
 Stephanie Matthews, Brittany Cotto, Marisa Sorajja, Adrienne Woods, Clair Courchene - strings
 Noah "Mailbox" Passavoy, Ron Benner, Bruce Buechner - recording engineers
 Fabian Marascuillo, Manny Marroquin - mixing
 Chris Athens - mastering
 Dwayne Carter, Jermaine Preyan, Ronald "Slim" Williams, Bryan "Birdman" Williams - executive producers
 Steven Taylor - photography
 Joe Spix - art direction
 Joe Spix, Olivia Smith - package design

Charts

References

Cash Money Records albums
Young Money Entertainment albums
2013 debut albums
PJ Morton albums